Alex Désert is an American actor and musician, known for his roles in the TV series The Flash, The Heights with Jamie Walters, Becker with Ted Danson, and Mr. Williams on Boy Meets World, as well as the voice of Nick Fury for The Avengers: Earth's Mightiest Heroes. Désert has been seen in Mom and Grey's Anatomy. Other television credits include Tyler Perry's House of Payne, House, Reno 911!, and The Sarah Silverman Program. In 2020, he started voicing Carl Carlson and Lou on The Simpsons, replacing Hank Azaria.

Career
His motion picture credits include the independent hit Swingers, Playing God, High Fidelity, Bob Funk and PCU with Jeremy Piven, David Spade and Jon Favreau, and Alexander and the Terrible, Horrible, No Good, Very Bad Day, from Disney Studios.

Désert has lent his voice to various animated series and video games including; The Avengers: Earth's Mightiest Heroes as Nick Fury; as Wise in the web series The LeBrons; Crystal Dynamic's Tomb Raider; and, Scarface: The World is Yours. He also portrayed the auto-tuned pimp Zimos in the 2011 THQ release, Saints Row: The Third; In the World of Warcraft expansion Battle for Azeroth he portrayed the loa Bwonsamdi.

In addition to his acting career, Désert is one of the lead singers in Hepcat, a ska/reggae band that has toured the United States, Australia and Europe with bands such as The Mighty Mighty Bosstones and The Specials. Having released four albums, Hepcat's exposure has included national magazine features and an appearance on Late Night with Conan O’Brien. He also lends his vocal talents to the Los Angeles-based reggae collective The Lions.

In 2020, he took over the role of Carl Carlson and Lou from Hank Azaria on The Simpsons in light of the George Floyd protests, starting with "Undercover Burns", which premiered on September 27, 2020.

Filmography

Film

Television

Video games

References

External links
 
 
 Official website for The Lions

African-American male actors
American male film actors
American male television actors
American male voice actors
Living people
1968 births
20th-century American male actors
21st-century American male actors
American ska singers
American reggae musicians
20th-century American singers
21st-century American singers
20th-century African-American male singers
21st-century African-American musicians